Nagydobsza is a village in Baranya county, Hungary.

Location 
Nagydobsza is located on the western border of Baranya county. The nearest cities are Szigetvár and Barcs, which are 11 kilometres and 19 kilometres away respectively.

Access 
6-os főút (Highway 6) passes through the village, making it easily accessible from other parts of the country.

The Gyékényes-Pécs railway line passes by the village, but does not stop there. The closest railway connection is offered by the Kisdobsza stop, about 800 metres southwest of the village.

External links 
 Street map 

Populated places in Baranya County